Sherjill Mac-Donald (born 20 November 1984) is a Dutch footballer who plays as a forward for KV Hooikt in Belgium.

Club career 
Mac-Donald started his career as a product of the Ajax youth system, and was loaned out to several clubs before being transferred to R.S.C. Anderlecht and then to AGOVV Apeldoorn.

He joined West Bromwich Albion on loan during the January 2007 transfer window, with the option of a permanent transfer at the end of his loan spell. He made his club debut as a substitute in a 2–1 victory over Plymouth Argyle on 31 January. On 27 February 2007 he missed a penalty during sudden death in the 6th round of the FA cup against Middlesbrough, who won 5–4 on penalties. After the end of the 2006–07 season it was announced that his loan period had been extended until January 2008. He has been described by West Bromwich Albion manager Tony Mowbray as "a special talent". On 4 January 2008, he signed a two and a half-year permanent contract with Albion, after they paid a £200,000 fee.

On 8 February 2008, Mac-Donald joined Hereford United on a month's emergency loan. He scored twice on his debut the following day in a 4–1 victory over Dagenham & Redbridge, earning him a place in the League Two Team of the Week. Three days later he scored a hat-trick against Rochdale in a 4–2 away win. Mac-Donald returned to the Hawthorns having scored six goals in seven league games.

He joined K.S.V. Roeselare on loan during the January 2009 transfer window.

During the 2009 close season he left West Bromwich Albion F.C. to sign a contract with K.F.C. Germinal Beerschot which will keep him at the club until 30 June 2013.

Mac-Donald joined Major League Soccer club Chicago Fire on 24 July 2012 under the league's designated player rule. His debut for the Chicago Fire was unsuccessful, as the Fire drew last second to the San Jose Earthquakes. He was released on 14 August 2013.

In July 2018, Mac-Donald joined Busan IPark in South Korea, but after an unsuccessful half-year, he left the club again and returned to Belgium. He then started to train with KFC Lille. Mac-Donald signed with the club and scored one goal and made one assist in his first game.

In July 2020, Mac-Donald joined ASV Geel. He played for KV Hooikt in the 2021–22 season, competing in the Second Provincial League. He finished the season with 35 appearances, in which he scored 26 goals.

International career 
Mac-Donald was capped for the Netherlands at U21 level, making his debut against an England U21 side who won 1–0 in November 2006. It was during this game that he came to the attention of West Bromwich Albion, as he played against Albion centre back Curtis Davies.

Personal life 
Mac-Donald is of Surinamese descent.

Honours
Sparta Rotterdam
 Eerste Divisie: 2015–16

References

External links
 
 
 

1984 births
Living people
Footballers from Amsterdam
Dutch footballers
Netherlands under-21 international footballers
Association football forwards
AVV De Volewijckers players
R.S.C. Anderlecht players
Heracles Almelo players
Hamburger SV II players
AGOVV Apeldoorn players
West Bromwich Albion F.C. players
Hereford United F.C. players
Chicago Fire FC players
K.S.V. Roeselare players
Beerschot A.C. players
K.V.C. Westerlo players
Sparta Rotterdam players
Busan IPark players
A.S. Verbroedering Geel players
Belgian Pro League players
Challenger Pro League players
Eerste Divisie players
Premier League players
English Football League players
Major League Soccer players
K League 2 players
Designated Players (MLS)
Dutch expatriate footballers
Dutch expatriate sportspeople in Belgium
Dutch expatriate sportspeople in the United States
Dutch expatriate sportspeople in England
Dutch expatriate sportspeople in Germany
Dutch expatriate sportspeople in South Korea
Expatriate footballers in Belgium
Expatriate footballers in Germany
Expatriate soccer players in the United States
Expatriate footballers in England
Expatriate footballers in South Korea
Dutch sportspeople of Surinamese descent